The blueside wrasse, Cirrhilabrus cyanopleura, is a species of wrasse native to the eastern Indian Ocean and the western Pacific Ocean. It can be found in the aquarium trade.

It feeds on zooplankton. It may be relatively common but declining because of threats: blast fishing, sedimentation, pollution, collection for the aquarium trade and habitat loss of shallow reefs.

References

External links
 

Blueside wrasse
Taxa named by Pieter Bleeker
Fish described in 1851